Norbert Tóth (born 11 July 1998) is a Hungarian racing driver currently competing in the European Touring Car Cup. He previously competed in the TCR International Series and SEAT León Eurocup.

Racing career
Tóth began his career in 2009 in karting. He switched to the SEAT León Eurocup in 2014, he ended 11th in the championship standings that year. In 2015 Tóth made his European Touring Car Cup debut with Zengő Motorsport, racing in the Single-makes Trophy. In April 2015, it was announced that Tóth would make his TCR International Series debut with Zengő Motorsport driving a SEAT León Cup Racer.

Racing record

Complete TCR International Series results
(key) (Races in bold indicate pole position) (Races in italics indicate fastest lap)

References

External links
 

1998 births
Living people
Hungarian racing drivers
European Touring Car Cup drivers
SEAT León Eurocup drivers
TCR International Series drivers
Zengő Motorsport drivers